Kharāj is a type of individual Islamic tax on agricultural land and its produce, developed under Islamic law.

With the first Muslim conquests in the 7th century, the kharaj initially denoted a lump-sum duty levied upon the lands of conquered provinces, which was collected by hold-over officials of the defeated Byzantine Empire in the west and the Sassanid Empire in the east; later and more broadly, kharaj refers to a land-tax levied by Muslim rulers on their non-Muslim subjects, collectively known as dhimmi. At that time, kharaj was synonymous with jizyah, which later emerged as a per head tax paid by the dhimmi. Muslim landowners, on the other hand, paid ushr, a religious tithe on land, which carried a much lower rate of taxation, and zakat. Ushr was a reciprocal 10% levy on agricultural land as well as merchandise imported from states that taxed Muslims on their products.

Changes soon eroded the established tax base of the early Arab Caliphates. Additionally, a large, but unsuccessful, expedition against the Byzantine Empire undertaken by the Umayyad caliph Sulayman in 717 brought the finances of the Umayyads to the brink of collapse. Even before Sulayman's ascent to power, the powerful governor of Iraq, al-Hajjaj ibn Yusuf, attempted to raise revenues by demanding from Muslims a full rate of taxation, but that measure met with opposition and resentment. To address these problems, Sulayman's successor Umar II worked out a compromise in which, beginning from 719, land from which kharaj was paid could not be transferred to Muslims; instead, they could lease such land, but in that case they would be required to pay kharaj from it. With the passage of time, the practical result of that reform was that kharaj was levied on most land without regard for the cultivator's religion. The reforms of Umar II were finalized under the Abbasids and would thereafter form the model of tax systems in the Islamic state. From that time on, kharaj was also used as a general term describing all kinds of taxes: for example, the classic treatise on taxation by the 9th century jurist Abu Yusuf was called Kitab al-Kharaj, i.e. The Book On Taxation.

20th-century Russian orientalist, A. Yu. Yakubovski, compares the land tax system of Persian Sassanids with that of the post-Islamic Caliphate era:
 A comparison between pre-Islamic documents and those of the Islamic period reveals that conquering Arabs increased the land taxation without exception. Thus, raising taxes of each acre of wheat field to four dirhams and each acre of barley field to two dirhams, whereas during reign of Khosro Anushiravan it used to be a single dirham for each acre of wheat or barley field. During the later stage of the Umayyad Caliphate, conquered and subjugated Persians were paying from one fourth to one third of their land produce to the Arab Empire as kharaj.

In the Ottoman Empire, kharaj evolved into haraç, a form of poll tax on non-Muslim subjects. It was superseded by cizye.

Notes

References
Cooper, Richard S. "The Assessment and Collection of Kharaj Tax in Medieval Egypt", Journal of the American Oriental Society, Vol. 96, No. 3. (Jul. – Sep., 1976), pp. 365–382.
Cummings, John Thomas; Askari, Hossein; Mustafa, Ahmad. "Islam and Modern Economic Change" in Esposito, 1980, pp. 25–47
Esposito, John L. (ed.). Islam and Development: Religion and Sociopolitical Change (Syracuse, NY, Syracuse University Press, 1980)
Gaudefroy-Demombynes, Maurice (tr. John P. MacGregor). Muslim Institutions (London, Allen & Unwin, 1950)
Hourani, Albert, A History of the Arab Peoples (Cambridge, MA : Belknap-Harvard University Press, 1991)
Melis, Nicola, “Il concetto di ğihād”, in P. Manduchi (a cura di), Dalla penna al mouse. Gli strumenti di diffusione del concetto di gihad, Angeli, Milano 2006, pp. 23–54.
Melis, Nicola, “Lo statuto giuridico degli ebrei dell’Impero Ottomano”, in M. Contu – N. Melis - G. Pinna (a cura di), Ebraismo e rapporti con le culture del Mediterraneo nei secoli XVIII-XX, Giuntina, Firenze 2003.
Melis, Nicola, Trattato sulla guerra. Il Kitāb al-ğihād di Molla Hüsrev, Aipsa, Cagliari 2002.
Hawting, G. R. The First Dynasty of Islam: The Umayyad Caliphate AD 661-750 (London, Routledge, 2000) 
Lambton, Ann K. S. Landlord and Peasant in Persia: A Study of Land Tenure and Land Revenue Administration (London, Oxford University Press, 1953) 
 
Poliak, A. N. "Classification of Lands in the Islamic Law and Its Technical Terms". The American Journal of Semitic Languages and Literatures, Vol. 57, No. 1. (Jan., 1940), pp. 50–62.
 
Watt, W. Montgomery. Islamic Political Thought: The Basic Concepts (Edinburgh, Edinburgh University Press, 1980)

External links

 The Institute of Ismaili Studies, Glossary H-K (kharaj)

Arabic words and phrases in Sharia
Islamic terminology
Taxation in Islam